Andrew J. Moyer (November 30, 1899 – February 17, 1959) was an American microbiologist. He was a researcher at the USDA Northern Regional Research Laboratory in Peoria, Illinois. His group was responsible for the development of techniques for the mass production of penicillin. This led to the wide scale use of penicillin in World War II. Moyer was inducted into the National Inventors Hall of Fame in 1987. A scholarship fund was created in his name at the University of Maryland in 1977.

Early life and education
Moyer was born in Star City, Indiana. He graduated from Wabash College with an A.B. in 1922, North Dakota Agricultural College with an M.S. in 1925, University of Maryland with a Ph.D. in 1929.

References

1899 births
1959 deaths
American microbiologists
Wabash College alumni
North Dakota State University
University of Maryland, College Park alumni
20th-century American inventors